"Marwa Blues" is an instrumental by English rock musician George Harrison. It was released on his final studio album, Brainwashed, in November 2002, a year after his death, and subsequently on a single as the B-side of "Any Road". The song is a slide guitar instrumental and named after Raga Marwa, an Indian classical raga traditionally played at sunset. "Marwa Blues" won the 2004 Grammy Award for Best Pop Instrumental Performance. Along with "Any Road" and the Brainwashed track "Rising Sun", it was also included on the 2009 compilation album Let It Roll: Songs by George Harrison.

Raga Marwa was one of Harrison's favourite ragas, having become familiar to him through interpretations by Ravi Shankar and Ali Akbar Khan. In the Indian tradition, the piece is renowned for its ability to invoke a melancholic mood at sunset. Harrison recorded "Marwa Blues" as a tribute to the raga and in acknowledgement of the importance of Indian music in his life.

The track includes Harrison's slide guitar parts and keyboard accompaniment. As described by Peter Lavezzoli in his book The Dawn of Indian Music in the West: "Along with its Hawaiian flavor, the melody sounds as if it could have been played by a sarod or vina, and is yet another demonstration of Harrison's unique slide approach ..." Author Simon Leng calls it "the most personal and emotionally resonant guitar performance of his career" and identifies the track as the culmination of the musical and spiritual journey Harrison had begun in 1966 as a sitar student under Shankar. Leng also writes: "His playing is at once almost unbearably touching and spiritually enraptured, offering a multidimensional emotional experience."

As with most of Brainwashed, "Marwa Blues" was completed in early 2002 by Harrison's son Dhani and Jeff Lynne. The released recording includes a musical quotation from "Within You Without You", Harrison's Indian-style composition from the Beatles' 1967 album Sgt. Pepper's Lonely Hearts Club Band.

Personnel
According to author Bill Harry:
George Harrison – slide guitars, keyboards, finger cymbals
Jeff Lynne – keyboards, acoustic guitar
Dhani Harrison – acoustic guitar
 Ray Cooper – percussion
Marc Mann – string arrangement and direction

References

Sources

 Bill Harry, The George Harrison Encyclopedia, Virgin Books (London, 2003).
 Elliot J. Huntley, Mystical One: George Harrison – After the Break-up of the Beatles, Guernica Editions (Toronto, ON, 2006).
 Ian Inglis, The Words and Music of George Harrison, Praeger (Santa Barbara, CA, 2010).
 Peter Lavezzoli, The Dawn of Indian Music in the West, Continuum (New York, NY, 2006).
 Simon Leng, While My Guitar Gently Weeps: The Music of George Harrison, Hal Leonard (Milwaukee, WI, 2006).

2002 songs
George Harrison songs
Instrumentals
Songs released posthumously
Songs written by George Harrison
Song recordings produced by George Harrison
Song recordings produced by Jeff Lynne